Dijana Bolanča Paulić (born 30 October 1974 in Zagreb) is a Croatian theatre, film and television actress .

Filmography

Television roles  
 "Odmori se, zaslužio si" as Biba Kosmički #1 (2006-2007)
 "Kad zvoni?" as prodavačica (2005)
 "Naši i vaši" as Iva Rašelić (2000-2002)

Movie roles 
 "Ne pitaj kako!" kao policajka (2006)
 "Generalov carski osmijeh" (2002)
 "Reci Saša, što je?" (2002)
 "Crna kronika ili dan žena" (2000)
 "Četverored" as Volođina tajnica (1999)
 "Puna kuća" (1998)
 "Dobrodošli u Sarajevo" as Ninina suradnica (1997)
 "Rusko meso" as Mimi (1997)
 "Letač Joe i Marija smjela" as djevojka (1996)

External links

1974 births
Living people
Actresses from Zagreb
Croatian stage actresses
Croatian film actresses
Croatian television actresses